M. L. Tigue Moore Field at Russo Park is a ballpark located on the South Campus of the University of Louisiana at Lafayette in Lafayette, Louisiana.  It was built in 1979 and currently has a capacity of 6,033, following the renovations/additions of 2016. It is the home stadium of the Louisiana Ragin' Cajuns baseball team. It was also home to the Lafayette Bullfrogs of the Central Baseball League.  The facility originally named Moore Field was renamed after University of Louisiana at Lafayette benefactor, M.L. Tigue Moore's death in 1994.

It is currently the largest baseball stadium in the Sun Belt Conference and one of the two largest collegiate baseball stadium in Louisiana.

History
Since 1999, the Ragin Cajuns have consistently ranked in the Top 50 nationally in total and average home attendance, and in recent years at or near the top 10. During the Cajuns’ 2000 College World Series run, they ranked 26th in total home attendance and hosted its first NCAA Regional. The 2014 season saw a record 145,589 enter "The Tigue" throughout the team's run to the NCAA Super Regionals.

In 2016, the program sold out of season tickets for the first time in school history with 3,002 available tickets sold.

Tigue Moore Field has hosted the Sun Belt Conference Baseball Tournament on five occasions (1997, 2001, 2003, 2008, 2013), NCAA Regionals three times (2000, 2014, 2016) and the NCAA Super Regionals once (2014)

Renovations
In 2010 "The Tigue" was converted from a natural surface to a full ProGrass Synthetic Turf System. Following the 2013 regular season, the scoreboard was replaced with a Daktronics HD video board and LED display.

Following the 2016 season the grandstand area was demolished and an entirely new structure was built in its place.  Along with full integration with the existing bleachers, new and expanded restrooms and concession areas were built.  Also, new terrace areas were added along the 1st & 3rd baselines, as well as a new club room added in the 3rd floor level of the grandstand, while 10 new luxury suites were added to the fourth floor. Expanded overhangs over both the grandstand and bleacher areas were built and capacity was increased to 6,033.  The projected cost was over $16 million With the renovations, the facility was renamed to the current M. L. Tigue Moore Field at Russo Park, denoting the financial contributions by the Russo family for the renovations.

Attendance

All rankings done by average attendance

See also
 List of NCAA Division I baseball venues

References

External links
Facility information

Baseball venues in Louisiana
College baseball venues in the United States
Louisiana Ragin' Cajuns baseball
Minor league baseball venues
Sports venues in Louisiana
Sports venues completed in 1979